MCT may refer to:

Astronomy
 A Maksutov–Cassegrain telescope
Morning Civil Twilight, from when the center of the Sun is less than 6° below the horizon to sunrise.

Biochemistry
Medium-chain triglycerides, a class of fat with specific dietary and technical properties (also MCT oil)
Monocarboxylate transporters, a family of proton-linked plasma membrane transporters that carry molecules having one carboxylate group (monocarboxylates), such as lactate and pyruvate, across biological membranes.
Methyl halide transferase, an enzyme

Companies
Marine Current Turbines
McClatchy-Tribune Information Services, the news service formerly known as Knight Ridder Tribune
Multi Channel Television, an Italian-based company, broadcasting though satellite, erotic programming

Computing
Microsoft Certified Trainer
Mobile Computer Terminal
Multi Core Timer in Exynos (system on chip) processors

Engineering
Maximum continuous thrust, an aviation abbreviation for a jet engine rating
Mercury cadmium telluride (HgCdTe), a semiconductor with a particularly narrow bandgap used in mid- and far-infrared detectors (e.g. night vision)
MOS-controlled thyristor, a type of thyristor (a solid-state semiconductor device)
Multi Cable Transits, A fire-stop is a fire protection system made of various components used to seal openings and joints in fire-resistance rated wall and/or floor assemblies. For penetrating cables, these can also be called as Multi Cable Transits (MCTs).

Medicine
Mast cell tumor
Methacholine challenge test, a medical test to assess the degree of a bronchial hyperresponsiveness (e.g. in asthma).
Munich Chronotype Questionnaire (MCTQ), a standardized test for evaluating patient sleep/wake patterns
Ketogenic diet (MCT diet)
 Micro Computed Tomography

Psychology 
Metacognitive therapy

Transportation 
Mars Colonial Transporter, a proposed interplanetary transportation system by SpaceX
Madison County Transit, a public transportation service in Madison County, Illinois
Muscat International Airport, the airport serving Muscat, Oman (IATA code is MCT)

Other
Minnesota Chippewa Tribe
Mengisa language (ISO 639 code: mct)
Marine Combat Training, a training course at the United States Marine Corps School of Infantry
Monotone convergence theorem, in mathematics
Motivation crowding theory, in economics
Member of the Association of Corporate Treasurers, a professional organization
Miss Chinese Toronto Pageant, the annual Toronto beauty pageant for Chinese Canadians
Manganese cyclopentadienyl tricarbonyl, an antiknock additive for gasoline
Mickelson Clarified Translation, in Modern English Bible translations
Mutable collagenous tissue

See also
MCTS (disambiguation)